El Salvador is a country in Central America.

El Salvador may also refer to:

Places
El Salvador, Chile
El Salvador mine
El Salvador (caldera)
El Salvador, Cuba
El Salvador, Misamis Oriental, Philippines
El Salvador, Quito, Ecuador
El Salvador, Zacatecas, Mexico
Villa El Salvador, a district on the outskirts of Lima, Peru

Music
"El Salvador" (Peter, Paul and Mary song), 1982
"El Salvador", a song by Athlete from Vehicles & Animals, 2003
"El Salvador", a song by White Lion from Fight to Survive, 1985

Other uses
El Salvador (ship), an 18th-century Spanish treasure ship
El Salvador (Mexico City Metrobús), a BRT station in Mexico City
El Salvador: Another Vietnam, a 1981 documentary film
Mezquita-Iglesia de El Salvador, Toledo, a church in Toledo, Spain

See also

Salvador (disambiguation)
Savior (disambiguation)